In functional analysis, a field of mathematics, the Banach–Mazur theorem is a theorem roughly stating that most well-behaved normed spaces are subspaces of the space of continuous paths. It is named after Stefan Banach and Stanisław Mazur.

Statement

Comments
On the one hand, the Banach–Mazur theorem seems to tell us that the seemingly vast collection of all separable Banach spaces is not that vast or difficult to work with, since a separable Banach space is "only" a collection of continuous paths. On the other hand, the theorem tells us that  is a "really big" space, big enough to contain every possible separable Banach space.

The simplest choice is to let  be the unit ball of the continuous dual , equipped with the w*-topology. This unit ball  is then compact by the Banach–Alaoglu theorem.

The mapping  is linear, and it is isometric by the Hahn–Banach theorem.

Stronger versions of the theorem
In 1995, Luis Rodríguez-Piazza proved that the isometry  can be chosen so that every non-zero function in the image  is nowhere differentiable.

References
 
 
 

Theory of continuous functions
Functional analysis
Theorems in functional analysis